Putok or star bread is a dense bread roll from the Philippines made with all-purpose flour, milk, and salt. It is typically dusted with coarse white sugar. It is a variant of pan de monja (monáy) distinguished primarily by the crown or star-shaped top of the bread resulting from a cross-shaped cut on the dough prior to baking. The name literally means "explosion" or "fissure" in Tagalog.

See also
Pandesal
Pinagong
 List of bread rolls

References 

Philippine breads
Yeast breads
Southeast Asian breads